USS Poughkeepsie may refer to the following ships of the United States Navy:

 was a Natick-class tugboat serving from 1971 to 2006

United States Navy ship names